John Richard Whiteley  (28 December 1943 – 26 June 2005) was an English presenter, and journalist, best known for his twenty-three years as host of the game show Countdown. Countdown was the launch programme for Channel 4 at 4:45 pm on 2 November 1982, and Whiteley was the first person to be seen on the channel (not counting a programme montage). Despite his intelligence, Whiteley enjoyed projecting the image of an absent-minded eccentric. His trademarks were his jolly, avuncular manner, fondness for puns, and his bold, sometimes garish wardrobe.

Thanks to over twenty years' worth of nightly instalments of Countdown as well as his work on the Yorkshire magazine programme Calendar and various other television projects, at the time of his death Whiteley was believed to have clocked more hours on British television screens—and more than 10,000 appearances—than anyone else alive, apart from Carole Hersee, the young girl who appeared on the BBC's Test Card F.

Early life
John Richard Whiteley was born 28 December 1943 in Bradford, West Riding of Yorkshire, and spent his childhood in Baildon: his family owned a long-established textile mill, Thomas Whiteley and Co of Eccleshill, which went out of business in the 1960s. At 13, he won a scholarship to Giggleswick School, Yorkshire, where his English teacher was Russell Harty. He later became a governor of the school. Leaving school with seven O-levels and three A-levels, from 1962 he read English at Christ's College, Cambridge.

Career

Early career
On leaving Cambridge in July 1965, Whiteley served three years as a trainee at ITN but left to join the newly created Yorkshire Television in July 1968.

In 1973 Whiteley and Woodrow Wyatt presented the Anglia Television documentary The Red Under the Bed, about the trial of the Shrewsbury Two (Des Warren and Ricky Tomlinson), which was broadcast on the day that the trial jury retired to consider their verdict. The programme, which was heavily critical of the trade union movement, is now considered to have swayed jurors into returning a guilty verdict and was later cited by the Criminal Cases Review Commission as evidence that the verdicts were unsound. Warren and Tomlinson's convictions were overturned in 2021. Speaking in 2017 about the documentary, Tomlinson claimed to be in possession of confidential documents proving that it had been funded and written by British intelligence services and that Whiteley had been employed by MI5 at the time of broadcast.

Whiteley was bitten by a ferret on an edition of Calendar in 1977. The animal bit his finger for half a minute before its owner, Brian Plummer, prised it free. The clip is often repeated on programmes showing television out-takes, and Whiteley once joked that when he died, the headlines would read, "Ferret man dies". He said, "It's made a lot of people laugh, and it's been shown all over the world. It's 30-odd years since it happened, and I think I've been a great PR man for the ferret industry. Ferrets have a lot to be grateful for; to me, you see, they've become acceptable because one of them bit me."

Countdown

In 1982, Yorkshire Television began to produce Countdown, copying a French quiz show format, Des chiffres et des lettres. Whiteley was chosen as host and continued with the show when Jeremy Isaacs brought it to Channel 4 as the first programme broadcast by the new station. Its first broadcast received over 3.5 million viewers, but the programme lost 3 million viewers for its second show.

However, it gradually rebuilt its audience over the following weeks. It was as the host of Countdown that Whiteley became known to a wider audience in the United Kingdom outside the Yorkshire region. He was nicknamed "Twice Nightly Whiteley", in reference to the time when he would present the Calendar news programme and Countdown in the same evening, from 1982 to 1995. (In a self-deprecating joke, he often countered this with "Once Yearly, Nearly".)

As the presenter of Countdown, Whiteley developed a reputation for wearing garish suits and ties, and it was common for Carol Vorderman to comment on this. Whiteley also told many anecdotes and puns, which were often met by groans from other presenters and audience members. He was granted the honorary title of "Mayor of Wetwang" in 1998 and was known for his amusement at the village's name.

Countdown was not intended to be a long-lasting format. Still, it quickly became a durable programme for Channel 4, at its peak enjoying a sizeable afternoon audience of almost five million. At the time of Whiteley's death, it still regularly attracted over a million viewers.

Whiteley had a cameo appearance role as himself, presenting Countdown, in the film About a Boy. From series 54, broadcast in 2005, the series champion has received the "Richard Whiteley Memorial Trophy" in his honour. Following his death, Whiteley was replaced by Des Lynam.

Other work
Whiteley also had his own chatshow, Richard Whiteley Unbriefed, on the BBC. His guests were unknown to him beforehand, so before he could interview them, he had to guess who they were.

Whiteley was one of the first people to report on the 1984 Brighton hotel bombing, as he was staying in the hotel at the time. He was the subject of This Is Your Life in March 1997 when he was surprised by Michael Aspel on the set of the ITV soap opera, Emmerdale.

In 2001, Whiteley stood as rector for University of Dundee.

On 15 June 2003, Whiteley appeared on the BBC show, Top Gear and set the slowest time in the Star in a Reasonably-Priced Car segment with a time of 2:06.

Illness and death
In May 2005, Whiteley was taken into hospital with pneumonia. He made a slow recovery from the illness, but doctors discovered problems with his heart and carried out an emergency operation for endocarditis on 24 June. This operation was not successful and, two days later on 26 June, Whiteley died at Leeds General Infirmary. He was buried at St John the Evangelist Church at East Witton.

He had suffered from asthma since he was very young and also had diabetes. The edition of Countdown that was due to be broadcast on 27 June was postponed as a mark of respect. Carol Vorderman gave an emotional tribute to him on 28 June when Countdown returned, stating that "The clock stopped too soon". Several shows had already been recorded before he went into the hospital. His final show was broadcast on 1 July 2005, which was the grand finale of the 53rd series.

Memorials

Organ donation

Whiteley was an organ donor, and it was reported his corneas were donated to help two people.

Memorial service
On 10 November 2005, five months after his death, thousands of friends and admirers gathered at York Minster for a memorial service to celebrate Whiteley's life. Guests included Vorderman, who paid tribute to him, saying, "If he were here, he would have welcomed you one-by-one, greeting every one of you by the hand and would have wanted a photograph taken".

Richard Whiteley Memorial Bursary
In 2007, Channel 4 announced its creation of the Richard Whiteley Memorial Bursary, a nine-month work experience placement at Yorkshire Television, working with True North Productions.

Vision Aid Overseas
Three pairs of Whiteley's spectacles were donated by Kathryn Apanowicz, his longtime partner, to optical charity Vision Aid Overseas (VAO). Sent with a team of optical professionals to Ethiopia, the VAO team found three Ethiopians whose eyes fitted Whiteley's prescription. The BBC followed this story on their Inside Out programme which was broadcast on 19 September 2007.

Giggleswick School
In 2008, three years after Whiteley's death, Giggleswick School announced its plans to raise £1.3m to build a theatre in his honour. The 288-seat theatre has been built at the school where Whiteley was a pupil and governor and provided a resource for the whole local community. Crews completed work on the second phase of the theatre in autumn 2010. The theatre now hosts a range of public performances.

Honours and private life
Whiteley was honoured with the Mayoralty of Wetwang in 1998, became a Deputy Lieutenant of West Yorkshire in 2003, and was appointed OBE in the June 2004 Queen's Birthday Honours List for services to broadcasting.

Bibliography

Books by Richard Whiteley
Letters Play!: a treasury of words and wordplay. London: Robson 
Whiteley, Richard (2000) Himoff!: the memoirs of a TV matinee idle London: Orion Books

Biographies
Apanowicz, Kathryn (2006) Richard by Kathryn. London: Virgin Books

TV appearances
 The Red Under the Bed (1973)
 Calendar (1968–1995)
 Countdown (1982–2005)
 Hallelujah! (1983)
 The Richard Whiteley Show (1995–1996)
 Richard Whiteley Unbriefed (1999)
 Have I Got News for You (Series 17, Episode 1, 1999)
 Holiday: You Call the Shots (2001–2002)
 The Big Breakfast (final episode, 29 March 2002)
 Top Gear (2003)
 SMTV Live (final episode, 27 December 2003)
 My Family (2003)
 Footage of Whiteley appears in the 2014 film Pride, where he reports on the end of the miners' strike.

References

Obituaries
 "Richard Whiteley" (The Daily Telegraph, 28 June 2005)
 "Thousands say farewell to 'Our Richard'" BBC News, 10 November 2005)
 "Farewell to a jolly good egg" (The Guardian, 28 June 2005)

External links
 
 UKGameshows: Richard Whiteley
 Richard Whiteley on CultIdols.com
 TV Cream's tribute to Richard Whiteley
 

1943 births
2005 deaths
Alumni of Christ's College, Cambridge
British reporters and correspondents
Countdown (game show)
Deaths from endocarditis
People with diabetes
Deputy Lieutenants of West Yorkshire
English game show hosts
English male journalists
English television presenters
Infectious disease deaths in England
Mayors of places in Yorkshire and the Humber
Officers of the Order of the British Empire
People educated at Giggleswick School
People from Baildon
Television personalities from West Yorkshire
Yorkshire Television